Crawford Lake is a lake in the Albany River drainage basin in Cochrane District, Ontario, Canada. The primary outflow is an unnamed creek which flows via the Cheepay River and the Albany River to James Bay.

See also
List of lakes in Ontario

References

Lakes of Cochrane District